Otopharynx speciosus is a species of cichlid endemic to Lake Malawi.  This species can reach a length of  TL. It has not yet been collected and exported for the aquarium trade.

References

speciosus
Fish described in 1935
Taxonomy articles created by Polbot